Vladimir Akimov may refer to:

 Vladimir Petrovich Akimov (1872–1921), Russian social-democrat leader
 Vladimir Ivanovich Akimov (1953–1987), Soviet water polo player